The Ministry of Culture is a department of the Albanian Government responsible for the implementation of government tourism, cultural affairs, youth and sports policy. The current minister is Elva Margariti of the Rama II Cabinet.

History
Since the establishment of the institution, the Ministry of Culture has been reorganized by joining other departments or merging with other ministries, thus making its name change several times. This list reflects the changes made in years in pluralist history since 1992 as an institution:

 Ministry of Culture, Youth and Sports (Ministria e Kulturës, Rinisë dhe Sporteve) from 1992 to 1996
 Ministry of Culture, Youth and Women (Ministria e Kulturës, Rinisë dhe Gruas) from 1996 to 1997
 Ministry of Culture, Youth and Sports (Ministria e Kulturës, Rinisë dhe Sporteve) from 1997 to 2005
 Ministry of Tourism, Culture, Youth and Sports (Ministria e Turizmit, Kulturës, Rinisë dhe Sporteve) from 2005 to 2013
 Ministry of Culture (Ministria e Kulturës) from 2013 - current

Subordinate institutions

Arts and Culture

 National Theater of Opera, Ballet and National Ensemble
 National Theatre
 National Experimental Theatre "Kujtim Spahivogli"
 National Museum of Fine Arts
 National Library
 National Museum of Photography "Marubi"
 Center for Realization of Artworks
 National Centre of Cultural Property Inventory
 National Center of Folkloric Activities
 National Center of Culture for Children
 Central State Film Archive
 National Circus

Museums

 National Museum of History
 Museum of Secret Surveillance
 Skanderbeg Museum 
 Ethnographic Museum of Kruja
 National Ethnographic Museum 
 National Iconographic Museum Onufri of Berat
 National Museum of Medieval Art
 National Museum of Education 
 National Archaeological Museum of Korçë
 Museum of Independence

Agencies, Institutions and Departments
 National Institute of Cultural Heritage
 Archeological Service Agency

Officeholders (1941–present)

Notes

See also
Culture of Albania

References

Culture
Ministries established in 2005
Albania
Albania
2005 establishments in Albania